Acropora monticulosa is a species of acroporid coral found in the southwest and northern Indian Ocean, the central Indo-Pacific, Australia, Southeast Asia, Japan, the East China Sea and the oceanic west Pacific Ocean. It is also found in the Tuamotus. It was described by Brüggemann in 1879.

Description
Its digitate colonies contain thick branches that contain a single axial corallite on the end, which the branches taper to. Its radial corallites are uniformly arranged and sized. Acropora monticulosa is cream or blue in colour and has a similar appearance to Acropora globiceps and Acropora retusa.

Distribution
It is classed as a Near Threatened species on the IUCN Red List and it is believed that its population is decreasing; the species is also listed under Appendix II of CITES. Figures of its population are unknown, but is likely to be threatened by the global reduction of coral reefs, the increase of temperature causing coral bleaching, climate change, human activity, the crown-of-thorns starfish (Acanthaster planci) and disease. The species occurs in the northern and southwestern Indian Ocean, the central Indo-Pacific, Australia, Southeast Asia, Japan, the East China Sea and the oceanic west Pacific Ocean; it also occurs in the Tuamotus.

Taxonomy
It was described as Madrepora monticulosa by Brüggemann in 1879.

References

Acropora
Corals described in 1879
Near threatened animals
Taxa named by Friedrich Brüggemann